Nicolaj Thomsen (born 8 May 1993) is a Danish professional footballer who plays as a midfielder for Danish 2nd Division club B.93.

Thomsen was born in Skagen and played youth football with Skagen IK and Frederikshavn fI before starting his professional career with AaB. After moving to French Ligue 1 club FC Nantes in 2016, he had a four-year stint with FC Copenhagen. Thomsen moved to Norwegian club Vålerenga in 2021, before returning to Denmark again, signing with SønderjyskE in January 2022.

Thomsen has won one cap with the Denmark national team.

Club career

Early career
Thomsen played for Skagen IK before he moved to Frederikshavn fI when he was 13 years old. Three years later, at the age of 16, he moved to the AaB academy.

AaB
Thomsen made his debut for AaB in the Danish Superliga as a starter in a 1–2 loss against Midtjylland on 4 April 2012. In his first season, he made six appearances, five of which were as a substitute. He scored his first goal for AaB in a 4–1 victory over Randers on 12 November 2013 in his 42nd Superliga appearance.

In April 2014, Thomsen extended his contract so that it ran until 31 December 2016. Kent Nielsen, AaB's head coach at the time, stated that Thomsen "has everything that is demanded of a modern football player in top football. Relentless energy and a fine technique."

Nantes
After five seasons in AaB, Thomsen signed with FC Nantes in the French Ligue 1 in June 2016. According to Tipsbladet, the price was DKK 3.9 million, which could increase to DKK 4.5 million depending on performance. In the summer transfer window of 2015, Thomsen had also been close to moving to the French club, but negotiations were slowed down as Thomsen suffers from lazy eye which means that he has a decreased eyesight of 90% in his right eye.

Thomsen made 13 appearances for the club before returning to Denmark in January 2017.

Copenhagen
On 12 January 2017, it was announced that Thomsen had signed a three-and-a-half-year contract with Copenhagen, expiring in June 2021. He made his debut for the club on 15 July 2017 in a 1–1 league draw against his former team AaB, coming on as a substitute in the second half for Kasper Kusk.

Thomsen scored his first goal for Copenhagen on 12 August 2018 in a Copenhagen Derby against Brøndby, establishing a 2–1 lead in the 77th minute after an assist by Viktor Fischer. The game finished 3–1.

His contract was not renewed when it expired in June 2021. Thomsen made a total of 90 appearances for Copenhagen, but his stint was plagued by injuries.

Vålerenga
On 5 August 2021, Thomsen signed with Norwegian Eliteserien club Vålerenga on a six-month contract. He made his debut for the club on 15 August in a 1–1 league draw away against Tromsø IL, replacing the suspended Christian Borchgrevink at right back. On 24 October, he scored his first goal for the club to secure a 2–1 win over Haugesund in the domestic league. He left the Norwegian club at the end of the year.

SønderjyskE
On 24 January 2022, Thomsen joined SønderjyskE on a deal until June 2024. He made his full debut on 18 February, providing an assist to Stefan Gartenmann in a 3–2 home loss to AGF. The following week, he was sent off early in a 1–0 league loss to Brøndby after receiving his second yellow card due to a challenge on Carl Björk. After a season, which ended with relegation, Thomsen left the club as he chose to terminate his contract due to a clause in his contract.

B.93
On 19 September 2022 it was confirmed, that Thomsen had signed a two-year deal with Danish 2nd Division side B.93.

International career
Nicolai Thomsen made his first international appearance on 1 March 2011, when he played for Denmark U18. Since then, he has played for U19 and U21, before getting his first match for the Danish national team on 18 November 2014 against Romania.

Thomsen scored the only Danish goal in the 1–1 draw against Iceland which qualified Denmark U-21 for the 2015 UEFA European Under-21 Championship. He was selected for the squad for the tournament and played the entire match in the opening win against the Czech Republic. He was in the line-up in the other two group stage-matches against Germany and Serbia. Thomsen was also chosen to the line-up in the semi final, where Denmark was defeated by Sweden.

Honours

Club
AaB
Danish Superliga: 2013–14
Danish Cup: 2013–14

Copenhagen
Danish Superliga: 2016–17, 2018–19
Danish Cup: 2016–17

References

External links 

1993 births
Living people
People from Skagen
Association football midfielders
Danish men's footballers
Denmark youth international footballers
Denmark under-21 international footballers
Denmark international footballers
Danish expatriate men's footballers
Danish Superliga players
Danish 2nd Division players
Ligue 1 players
Eliteserien players
Frederikshavn fI players
AaB Fodbold players
FC Nantes players
F.C. Copenhagen players
Vålerenga Fotball players
SønderjyskE Fodbold players
Boldklubben af 1893 players
Expatriate footballers in France
Danish expatriate sportspeople in France
Expatriate footballers in Norway
Danish expatriate sportspeople in Norway
Sportspeople from the North Jutland Region